Travunioidea is a superfamily of armoured harvestmen in the order Opiliones. There are 4 families and more than 70 described species in Travunioidea.

Families
These four families belong to the superfamily Travunioidea:
 Cryptomastridae Derkarabetian & Hedin, 2018
 Cladonychiidae Hadži, 1935
 Paranonychidae Briggs, 1971
 Travuniidae Absolon & Kratochvíl, 1932

References

Further reading

 
 
 
 
 

Harvestmen
Arachnid superfamilies